Makarud or Maka Rud or Makarood may refer to:
 Makarud, Kelardasht, Chalus County
 Maka Rud, Kuhestan, Chalus County
 Maka Rud, Tonekabon